The Bank of Vancouver was a short-lived Canadian chartered bank that was established in Vancouver, British Columbia on July 30, 1910, and went out of business on December 14, 1914.

The bank was incorporated on April 3, 1908, with a "capital stock of $2,000,000". It opened on July 30, 1910, in the Flack Building on the corner of Hastings and Cambie Streets "in the midst of a real estate and industrial boom", with Robert Purves McLennan as president. Its founders included Lieutenant Governor James Paterson and William Harold Malkin. A branch was opened in the provincial capital of Victoria.

However, the economic boom ended in 1912. Also, British and German capital began leaving British Columbia because of fears of impending war. The bank limped along for two more years, but the failure of the Dominion Trust Company in October 1914 shook public confidence in financial institutions, and depositors began withdrawing their money. The bank was forced to suspend payments on December 14.

Canadian chartered banks were allowed to issue bank notes until 1943. On June 24, 2010, the first $5 bank note issued by the Bank of Vancouver (serial number 000001) was sold at auction for $177,000.

References

Defunct banks of Canada
Economy of British Columbia
Banks disestablished in 1914
Banks established in 1910